Modern pentathlon was one of 17 sports at the first Pan American Games in 1951, which took place in Buenos Aires, Argentina from 25 February to 3 March. There was an individual and team competition for men.

Results

Men's events

Medal table

References 
  .
 
 

1951
Modern pentathlon
Pan American Games
1951 Pan American Games